Virgil Trofin (July 24, 1926June 1984) was a Romanian communist activist and politician, who served as minister under the Communist regime.

Biography
Born in Vaslui, Trofin had an early career as a mechanical fitter and boilermaker. He was relatively close to Communist Party leader Ana Pauker before she was purged from office in 1953: he named his daughter in her honor (a common habit among prominent communists of the time).

Rallying with General Secretary Gheorghe Gheorghiu-Dej, he was among the younger activists to be promoted by the latter in the wake of Pauker's downfall. From June 1956 to June 1964, he was First Secretary of the Union of Communist Youth. In the Great National Assembly, Trofin represented Podu Turcului, Bacău County from 1957 to 1965, Gherla from 1965 to 1969, Pitești from 1969 to 1975, Brașov from 1975 to 1980 and Târgu Jiu from 1980 to November 1981.

His influence in the government increased due to his work in eliminating the primary obstacle to Nicolae Ceauşescu's rise to power, Gheorghe Apostol (during which time he joined the Politburo and Central Committee). A secretary of the Central Committee charged with cadre policies after 1965, Trofin served for a time as Deputy Prime Minister. From 1969 to 1971 he was chairman of the National Union of Agricultural Production Co-operatives.

In 1971 he was appointed as chairman of the Central Council of the General Union of Trade Unions but replaced in the party secretariat by Ion Iliescu (a Radio Free Europe analysis at the time proposed either that Trofin was demoted or that the Party placed more emphasis on workers by placing a high-ranking activist as union policy maker). He had his ups and downs in his relationship with Ceauşescu (with corresponding career successes and failures). In 1979 he replaced Vasile Patilineţ as Minister of Mines, Oil and Geology.

In November 1981, Trofin was accused of being responsible for sending poor-quality coal to power stations, expelled from the Central Committee, and demoted to being chairman of the Central Committee of Artisans' Cooperatives, and, after further confrontations with the leadership, director of a collective farm. In Victor Frunză's view, the charge was actually a cover-up for Ceauşescu's own mismanagement of the mining industry (before and after the Jiu Valley miners' strike of 1977).

Based on various pieces of evidence, it was contended that he committed suicide. Contrary to official practice, no obituary was published in Communist Party newspapers, and the cause of death was not disclosed.

Trofin had a son, Mircea, and a daughter, Ana.

References

Victor Frunză, Istoria stalinismului în România ("The History of Stalinism in Romania"), Humanitas, Bucharest, 1990
Vladimir Tismăneanu, Stalinism pentru eternitate, Polirom, Iaşi, 2005  (translation of Stalinism for All Seasons: A Political History of Romanian Communism, University of California Press, Berkeley, 2003)

External links
 Remus Radu, "Războiul de peste 30 de ani dintre oraşe cu vanităţi istorice" ("The War of over 30 Years between Cities with Historical Conceits"), in Cotidianul, January 31, 2006

1926 births
1984 deaths
People from Vaslui
Boilermakers
Romanian communists
Romanian trade unionists
Deputy Prime Ministers of Romania
Members of the Great National Assembly